Federico Henríquez y Carvajal (16 September 1848 – 4 February 1952) was a writer, journalist and teacher from the Dominican Republic.

Biography
Born in Santo Domingo, Henríquez y Carvajal was the son of Noel Henríquez Altías, a Dutch Sephardic Jew from Curaçao, and Clotilde Carvajal Fernández, a Dominican woman; he had 10 siblings, including Francisco Henríquez y Carvajal, who was President of the Dominican Republic. Henríquez was uncle of Francisco, Pedro, and Camila Henríquez Ureña.

He was married to Carmen María Amalia García Ricardo and had 10 children: Ángel Porfirio, Flor de María Gregoria, Fernando Abel, Luz, Carmela, Enriquillo, Federico Noel, Luis Adolfo, Salvador Colombino, and Carmita María Adelina.

Henríquez was Rector of the University of Santo Domingo and Chairman of the Dominican Academy of History. He also was Justice-President of the Supreme Court of the Dominican Republic and Minister of Home Affairs.

References 

People from Santo Domingo
Dominican Republic male writers
Dominican Republic journalists
Male journalists
Academic staff of Universidad Autónoma de Santo Domingo
Dominican Republic people of Spanish descent
Dominican Republic people of Jewish descent
Dominican Republic people of Taíno descent
Dominican Republic people of Dutch-Jewish descent
1848 births
1952 deaths
Government ministers of the Dominican Republic
Dominican Republic centenarians
Dominican Republic people of Curaçao descent
Men centenarians